John McFarlane (30 September 1933 – May 2010) was a New Zealand cricketer. He played in one first-class match for Northern Districts in 1964/65.

See also
 List of Northern Districts representative cricketers

References

External links
 

1933 births
2010 deaths
New Zealand cricketers
Northern Districts cricketers
People from Mount Gambier, South Australia